Kalacha may refer to:

Kalacha, Afghanistan, or Qalacha
Kalacha, East Azerbaijan, Iran, or Qalehcheh
Kalacha, Markazi, Iran, or Emamzadeh Deh Chal
Nigatun, Armenia, formerly known as Kalacha

See also

Kalach (disambiguation)
Qalaça, Azerbaijan
Qal'acha, Tajikistan
Kalachah, Iran